i-Generation Wrestling Superstars of Wrestling was a small series of professional wrestling shows in 2000. The roster consisted of wrestlers who had previously achieved fame in other promotions. The tour promoted a World Championship, an International Championship and a Tag Team Championship. i-Generation performed one tour of Australia. One event was filmed and broadcast as a pay-per-view event, later released on video. The show featured Dennis Rodman in the main event, and was advertised as Rodman Down Under. In 2011, the Bleacher Report ranked i-Generation Superstars of Wrestling at No.19 on its list of the 25 worst professional wrestling promotions in history.

Superstars of Wrestling
Superstars of Wrestling was a pay-per-view event held by i-Generation. It took place on July 30, 2000 (and aired in the United States on December 1, 2000) from the Sydney SuperDome in Sydney, Australia. With the subtitle "Rodman Down Under", it was promoted largely for its main event which pitted the scientific veteran Curt Hennig against the controversial NBA star Dennis Rodman.

Vince Mancini and Ted DiBiase provided commentating for the event. Between each match, a female dance team known as the i-Generettes (similar to the Nitro Girls) performed at the entry way.

Results

Championships

i-Generation World Heavyweight Championship

i-Generation Australasian Championship

i-Generation Tag Team Championship

See also

 Professional wrestling in Australia
 List of professional wrestling organisations in Australia
 World Championship Wrestling
 World Wrestling All-Stars

References

Further reading
 Rodman Down Under: Former NBA Star Goes to the Mat in Worldwide Pay Per View Wrestling Showdown, Dec. 1.
i-Generation World Heavyweight Championship history - Solie.org
i-Generation Australasian Championship history - Solie.org
i-Generation Tag Team Championship history - Solie.org

External links
WrestlingClassics.com Message Board
p.W.w. - Everything Wrestling

Professional wrestling shows
2000 in professional wrestling
Professional wrestling in Australia
Australian professional wrestling promotions
Events in Sydney